Mykola Mykolaiovych Bortnyk (born 8 March 1990), better known by his stage name Max Barskih and alter-ego Mickolai, is a Ukrainian singer and songwriter. He was raised in Kherson, Ukraine, and moved to Kyiv after his graduation. He has released six studio albums, one compilation album and one extended-play.

Career

Max Barskih rose to fame in Ukraine and post-Soviet countries in 2008 as participant of the Ukrainian talent show "Fabryka Zirok 2" (Star Factory 2).
 
In 2010, Max Barskih won his first big prize with being awarded "Best Ukrainian Act" at the MTV Europe Music Awards. 

Max Barskih also had his acting debut in 2010, when he starred in Lara Fabian's  musical feature film Mademoiselle Zhivago (that was published in 2013).

In 2012, Barskih entered the Eurovision Song Contest Auditions for Ukraine with the English version of his song "Dance", but narrowly lost to Gaitana who represented Ukraine in Baku with her song "Be My Guest".

Max Barskih has won numerous awards, including "Singer of the Year" Awards at the Baltic Music Awards 2011, the "Crystal Microphone" Awards 2011, the M1 Music Awards 2017, the GQ Men of the Year Awards 2018, the New Radio Awards 2019, the Love Radio Awards 2019 and at the Top Hit Music Awards 2020.

Forbes Magazine USA and Vogue Ukraine called Barskih "the internationally most successful Russian language singer".

Throughout his career, Barskih has worked closely with Alan Badoev, who is his producer and has also directed most of his music videos. Barskih's videos have gained popularity in the CIS nations. The director likes to use a variety of visual effects for many of his videos, such as in the music videos for "Теряю тебя" ("Lost in Love") which was released in 3D format in the CIS nations.

Barskih composes the music and writes the lyrics of his songs himself (and was e.g. nominated at the 2019 Russian National Music Awards for "Lyricist of the Year"), and partly also does the producing. Most of his songs are in Russian, but he has also sung in Ukrainian (e.g. "Небо" and "Двоє") and in English (e.g. "Z.Dance" (partly in English) and "Silence" (entirely in English)).

During the 2022 Russian invasion of Ukraine Barskih joined the Armed Forces of Ukraine.

Other ventures

Songwriting 
Barskih writes his songs himself and occasionally also works as a songwriter for other artists.

Acting 
Barskih has starred as an actor in two musical feature films.

Discography

Studio albums

 1:MAX BARSKIH (2009)
 Z.Dance (2012)
 По Фрейду (By Freud, 2014)
 Туманы (Mists, 2016)
 7 (2019)
 1990 (2020)

Compilation albums

 Words (2015)

EPs

 Mickolai – EP (2015)

Singles 

 2009: S.L. (Suka Lyubov') [Love is a bitch]
 2009: Пусто (Pusto) [Empty]
 2009: DVD (with Natalia Mogilevskaya)
 2010: Агония (Agoniya) [Agony]
 2010: Сердце бьётся (Serdtse Byotsya) [Heart is Beating] (with Svetlana Loboda)
 2010: Студент (Student)
 2011: Lost in Love | Теряю тебя (Terayu Tebya) [Losing you]
 2011: Белый ворон (Beliy Voron) [White Raven]
 2011: Atoms | Глаза-убийцы (Glaza-ubiytsi) [Eyes of a Killer]
 2011: Downtown
 2011: Dance
 2012: F**K OFF
 2012: Higher
 2012: Alive | Пылай (Pylay) [Blaze]
 2012: I Wanna Run |  Я болею тобой (Ya boleyu toboy) [I'm a fan of you]
 2013: По Фрейду (By Freud)
 2013: Какой была твоя любовь? (What was your love?)
 2013: Hero_in
 2013: Небо (Sky)
 2014: Отпусти (Let Me Go)
 2014: Всё серьёзно (Everything's Serious)
 2015: Хочу танцевать (I Want To Dance)
 2015: Подруга – Ночь (Night is my friend)
 2016: Займёмся Любовью (Let's Make Love)
 2016: Последний летний день (Last Day of Summer)
 2016: Туманы (Mists)
 2016: Неверная (Unfaithful)
 2017: Моя любовь (My love)
 2017: Февраль (February)
 2018: Берега (Shores)
 2019: Неслучайно (For a Reason)
 2019: Лей, не жалей (Pour, Have No Regrets)
 2020: Небо льёт дождем (Sky is Raining)
 2020: ПО СЕКРЕТY (In Secret)
 2020: Silence
2021: Bestseller (feat. Zivert)
2021: Tequila Sunrise
2022 Don’t Fuck With Ukraine

Filmography

Awards and nominations

References

External links

 
 
 

1990 births
Living people
21st-century Ukrainian  male singers
English-language singers from Ukraine
MTV Europe Music Award winners
Musicians from Kherson
Russian-language singers
Ukrainian pop singers
Winners of the Golden Gramophone Award
Ukrainian military personnel of the 2022 Russian invasion of Ukraine
Military personnel from Kherson